USS Robert Smalls (CG-62) is a  guided-missile cruiser built during the Cold War for the United States Navy. Commissioned in 1989, the warship was originally named USS Chancellorsville for the American Civil War Battle of Chancellorsville. In March 2023, she was renamed for Robert Smalls, a slave who freed himself and others by commandeering a Confederate transport ship.

Until 30 December 2011, the ship was operationally part of Carrier Strike Group Seven. In 2010 she was administratively under the command of Commander, Naval Surface Forces Pacific. Currently she is assigned to Carrier Strike Group Five and is deployed to Yokosuka, Japan.

Robert Smalls is equipped with guided missiles and rapid-fire cannons, with anti-air, anti-surface and anti-subsurface capabilities. She also carries two Seahawk Light Airborne Multi-Purpose System (LAMPS) helicopters, focused on anti-submarine warfare.

Ship renaming 
The National Defense Authorization Act for Fiscal Year 2020 created a new Naming Commission to examine names across the US armed forces that honor the Confederate States of America, the group of states that attempted to break away from the US during the American Civil War. Chancellorsville was explicitly named in early news reports about the commission due to its clear association with the Confederate victory at the Battle of Chancellorsville, which included a portrait of generals Robert E. Lee and Thomas "Stonewall" Jackson in the cruiser's wardroom. The painting was removed in 2016. The commission's report noted that Chancellorsvilles crest also included an inverted wreath that commemorated the death of Jackson during the Battle of Chancellorsville.

In September 2022, the Naming Commission recommended that the US Navy rename two shore installations, USNS Maury (T-AGS-66) (named for Matthew Fontaine Maury, who chose to fight for the Confederates), and Chancellorsville. The choice of what to rename them to was left to the Secretary of the Navy. As part of its report, the Commission judged that the ship celebrated the Confederacy. 

On 27 February 2023, the Secretary of the Navy Carlos Del Toro announced that the US Navy would rename Chancellorsville after Robert Smalls, a slave who commandeered the Confederate ship CSS Planter in 1862. The name change was made effective on 1 March 2023. The Navy held a ceremony to mark the change that was designed to not disrupt the ship's activities.

History

The ship, named Chancellorsville, was commissioned at Ingalls Shipbuilding in Pascagoula, Mississippi, on 4 November 1989.

1990s 
She first deployed in March 1991, to the Persian Gulf in support of Operation Desert Storm.

Chancellorsville was next deployed from February to August 1993, to the Persian Gulf as part of the Nimitz Battle Group. On 26 June 1993, Chancellorsville launched strikes on the Iraqi Intelligence Center in Baghdad with nine Tomahawk missiles in retaliation for the aborted assassination attempt on former President Bush. She deployed again to the Western Pacific and Persian Gulf from April to October 1995.

Following a Fifth Fleet deployment to the North Persian Gulf in 1995, Chancellorsville was awarded the Spokane Trophy in 1996.  The Spokane Trophy is awarded by Commander-in-Chief, United States Pacific Fleet to the surface combatant ship considered to be the most proficient in overall combat systems readiness and warfare operations.

Chancellorsville deployed to the Caribbean and Eastern Pacific in support of joint counter-narcotics operations in November 1997. During this deployment, she rescued the crew of an Ecuadorian fishing vessel which had been adrift for ten days. Upon her return home, Chancellorsville underwent her first major nine-month overhaul in San Diego, California.

On 7 July 1998, Chancellorsville changed homeport from San Diego, to Yokosuka, Japan, joining Task Force 70/Battle Force Seventh Fleet, and probably, Carrier Group Five. After arriving in Yokosuka, Chancellorsville participated in multinational operations in the Sea of Japan, including the International Fleet Review. Chancellorsville took part in exercises with the Kitty Hawk Battle Group in the spring of 1999.

In May 2000, Chancellorsville participated in exercises with the Thai and Singaporean navies.

2000s
Following a visit to Qingdao, China, in August 2000, Chancellorsville took part in ANNUALEX 12G, a joint U.S.-Japanese naval exercise. In November, Chancellorsville fired guns and SM-2 missiles as part of MISSILEX 01-1. In March through June 2001, she visited Singapore, Thailand, Saipan and Sydney, Australia, as part of an extended Spring Cruise. Chancellorsville then entered dry dock for an upkeep period in the fall.

In September 2001, Chancellorsville deployed with the Kitty Hawk Battle Group in support of Operation Enduring Freedom, operating in the theater for several months.

In March 2003, the ship was assigned to Carrier Group Five. On 22 October 2003, Chancellorsville played host in Guam to two warships of the People's Republic of China, which made the first-ever visit of the Chinese navy to Guam. By May 2004, she was back in the Southwest Asian region, where she lent aid to a disabled Indonesian fishing boat.

On 19 July 2004, Chancellorsville departed Yokosuka to participate in Exercise Summer Pulse 2004 and Joint Air and Sea Exercises (JASEX) 2004, with the Kitty Hawk Battle Group. Summer Pulse was the Navy's first implementation of the new Fleet Response Plan (FRP). She returned to homeport 7 September.

Chancellorsville entered a nine-week dry dock availability in February 2005. Following the maintenance period, she immediately returned to sea to participate in the exercises Talisman Saber 2005, the third annual Orange Crush and the Joint Air and Sea Exercise (JASEX) 2005. She returned to Yokosuka in August. ANNUALEX 2005 commenced in November with Chancellorsville participating, along with other U.S. and Japanese assets. The exercise saw a total of 61 naval vessels, including two U.S. submarines, 10 U.S. Navy ships and 49 Japanese ships. Chancellorsville visited Hong Kong at the end of November and returned to Yokosuka 12 December. Chancellorsville swapped with  based in San Diego. Chancellorsvilles homeport was changed to San Diego, with Shiloh moving to Yokosuka. The crews remained in their respective locations.

In winter of 2006, Chancellorsville deployed again into the Western Pacific, visiting Singapore and Pattaya, Thailand, in February. In April, she joined forces of the Republic of Korea for Reception, Staging, Onward-movement, & Integration and Foal Eagle 2006 (RSOI/Foal Eagle 06), exercises utilizing more than 70 U.S. and Korean ships. Chancellorsville returned to Yokosuka in August in preparation for a hull swap with Shiloh. Chancellorsville was scheduled to return to San Diego, in October 2006, making it her homeport once again.

2010s

In March 2011, in company with the carrier , Chancellorsville was deployed off northeastern Honshu, Japan, to assist with relief efforts after the 2011 Tōhoku earthquake and tsunami. During that time, helicopter crews from Ronald Reagan were exposed to leaking radiation from the nuclear accidents and ships from the carrier strike group were moved to avoid being downwind from the facility.

During the latter half of 2012, Chancellorsville underwent equipment upgrades as part of the Aegis Modernization effort ACB-12. In January 2013, the ship spent five days under way off the coast of California to perform a series of tests of the updated ACB-12 equipment and software.

In November 2013, while testing combat weapons systems off the coast of Point Mugu, California, a BQM-74E unmanned drone being used in the exercise failed to respond to commands to turn away from the ship and collided with Chancellorsville. Since it was a tracking exercise and not a live fire exercise, the crew did not engage the drone with the Phalanx CIWS. Two sailors received treatment for minor burns and the ship suffered some damage and returned to San Diego for assessment. The damage later proved to be more severe than initially assessed. Citing Navy sources, the U.S. Naval Institute reported that repairs to the ship would cost $30 million and take six months to complete.

On 7 June 2019 Chancellorsville came close to a collision with the Russian destroyer . Each side blamed the other for the near collision. Russian sources stated that the incident occurred in the southeast of the East China Sea while US sources named the location as in the Philippine Sea. According to retired US Navy captain Carl Schuster, the Russian ship's wake shows that it "didn't adhere to either the rules of the road or the incidents at sea agreement." United States Seventh Fleet spokesman Commander Clayton Doss said the Russian destroyer came within  of Chancellorsville, "putting the safety of her crew and ship at risk." The Russian Navy released a statement claiming that Chancellorsville had "suddenly changed its course and crossed the Admiral Vinogradov destroyer's course some 50 meters away from the ship." According to the same statement, this caused Admiral Vinogradov to take an "emergency maneuver" in order to avoid a collision with the American ship.

In November 2019 and again on 15 February 2020, the ship transited the Taiwan Strait.

2020s
During the 2020 George Floyd protests, the name of the ship came into question because it honors a victory of the Confederate Army fighting against the United States for southern independence and in defense of slavery. In December 2020, the U.S. Navy's Report to Congress on the Annual Long-Range Plan for Construction of Naval Vessels stated that the ship was planned to be placed Out of Commission in Reserve in 2026.

In May 2022, Chancellorsville was homeported out of Yokosuka, Japan. She was as part of Carrier Strike Group 5 led by the carrier Ronald Reagan. On 28 August 2022, Chancellorsville along with sister ship  conducted a routine transit through the Taiwan Strait. This was the first such transit to occur since the 2022 visit by Nancy Pelosi to Taiwan.

Awards and decorations
 Navy E Ribbon - (1994, 1995, 1999, 2000, 2001, 2002, 2003)
Spokane Trophy Award (1996, 2016)

Notes

References

External links

 Official USS Robert Smalls website
 USS Chancellorsville information site
 

 

Ticonderoga-class cruisers
Ships built in Pascagoula, Mississippi
1988 ships
Cold War cruisers of the United States
Cruisers of the United States
Maritime incidents in 2013
Confederate States of America monuments and memorials